Belt Line Road is a loop road that traverses  through 16 cities in Dallas County, Texas. Belt Line Road is the outer complete loop which encircles Dallas, in contrast with I-635 which forms a partial inner loop, Loop 12 which forms a complete inner loop, and President George Bush Turnpike (SH 190), a partial outer loop.   

Belt Line Road is not designated as a Texas State Loop, but as a local street in each jurisdiction through which it passes. One stretch of the road is designated as FM 1382 and is maintained by the state.

No portion of Belt Line Road is a controlled access freeway.

Route description

In addition to entering the city limits of Dallas for multiple stretches of the road, Belt Line Road also travels through the municipalities of Cedar Hill, Grand Prairie, Irving, Coppell, Carrollton, Addison, Richardson, Garland, Mesquite, Sunnyvale, Balch Springs, Wilmer, Lancaster, and DeSoto.

Discontinuities
Belt Line Road is not a straightforward and continuous loop. As one follows the entire course of Belt Line Road, there are several discontinuities and name variations. Starting in the northwest corner of the loop road, the following deviations and turns are noted:
At Coppell, to follow Belt Line following the east-west portion of the road heading westbound, one must make a left turn at the 4-way intersection with Southwestern Boulevard and Denton Tap Road. Likewise, when proceeding to this intersection from the opposite direction (Southwestern Blvd heading east), to follow the course of South Belt Line Road one must make a right turn or continue straight to head east on the east-west portion of the road.
In Richardson, a portion of Belt Line Road is named Main Street from North Central Expressway (US 75) to Bowser Road. After Bowser Road, Main Street becomes Belt Line again.
In Garland, Belt Line Road becomes First Street from Buckingham Road until the junction of First Street and Broadway Blvd, where the course of Belt Line follows Broadway Blvd. After crossing I-30 in south Garland, where Broadway becomes Belt Line again.
In central Mesquite, shortly after crossing US 80, a short segment of Belt Line is called "Bryan-Belt Line Road"
In south Mesquite, Belt Line Road makes a left turn at a T intersection with Lake June Rd, where Belt Line proceeds southeast towards Balch Springs. Likewise, when proceeding to this T intersection from Balch Springs, to follow the course of Belt Line Road one must make a right turn.
From I-35E in DeSoto, Belt Line Road is also called FM 1382. However, in Cedar Hill, the name "Belt Line" is temporarily lost as FM 1382 starts to head northwest (the name instead follows the original routing of Belt Line Road, some of which was submerged with the creation of Joe Pool Lake). After passing west of Joe Wilson Road, follow the course of FM 1382.
At I-20 in Grand Prairie, the name "Belt Line" re-appears with FM 1382. FM 1382 is continued as part of Belt Line Road until it reaches SH 180-Main Street.
At Jefferson St/SH 180-Main St in central Grand Prairie, until 2009 southbound Belt Line Road followed 8th Street while northbound Belt Line Road followed 9th Street through the middle of Grand Prairie.  (9th Street was not originally part of Belt Line; it was added when 8th Street was made one way to alleviate congestion.)  A new overpass was opened at this intersection to bypass the wait at the Union Pacific crossing and is a two-way street; however, 8th Street and 9th Street remain a paired coupling to serve local businesses.

Farm to Market Road 1382

FM 1382 is a state highway in Texas that runs from I-35E in DeSoto to SH 180 in Grand Prairie. Most of the highway is part of Belt Line Road, becoming its own route through Cedar Hill around Joe Pool Lake. FM 1382 was designated in 1949 from US 80 (now SH 180) southward 4.8 miles to a road intersection. In 1954, FM 1382 extended southeast 6 miles to a county road near Cedar Hill. In 1958, FM 1382 extended 1.7 miles to Belt Line Road in Cedar Hill. In 1972, FM 1382 extended east to IH 35E, replacing FM 1381 which started in DeSoto 2.2 miles west of IH-35E. In 1995, FM 1382 became an Urban Road.

Major intersections

References

Transportation in Dallas County, Texas